Buttar Bakhuha is a small village in the Giddarbaha tehsil of Sri Muktsar Sahib district in Punjab, India. The village is predominated by the Jatt people of Buttar clan.

Geography

The village is 7 km away from the Giddarbaha city and 265 km from the state capital city of Chandigarh. Husnar (4.5 km), Madhir (4.5 km) and Kot Bhai (4.5 km) are the surrounding villages.

Demographics

At the 2001 census, the village had a total population of 1,985 with 332 households, 1,038 males and 947 females. Thus males constituted 52% and females 48% of the population with the sex ratio of 912 females per thousand males.

Culture

The village is predominated by the Jatts of Buttar community/clan. The population mainly follows the Sikh faith.

Punjabi is the mother tongue as well as the official language of the village.

References

Villages in Sri Muktsar Sahib district